Garrett Byrnes (born December 30, 1971) is an American composer.

Byrnes was born in Bad Kreuznach, Germany while his father was stationed at the U.S. Army Base there, and relocated to New Jersey in the United States.  He studied music composition, receiving his bachelor's degree from the Boston Conservatory, his master's degree from the Peabody Institute of the Johns Hopkins University, and his doctorate from the Indiana University Jacobs School of Music.

Since embarking on his professional career, Byrnes has worked with numerous performers both in the United States and abroad.  His music has been read and performed by ensembles including the Minnesota Orchestra, Orchestre National des Pays de la Loire, Indianapolis Symphony Orchestra, Contra Costa Chamber Orchestra, Chesapeake Youth Repertory Orchestra, Peabody Symphony and Concert orchestras, Indiana University New Music Ensemble, Cleveland Chamber Collective, Tarab Cello Ensemble, and Tonus Percussion Group.  Byrnes' orchestral music in particular is currently gaining wider recognition.  In 2004 the Indiana University New Music Ensemble premiered his Concerto for Piano and Chamber Orchestra.  Later that same year his work "Red Moon" was premiered in California after receiving the Northridge Prize for orchestral composition.  On December 1, 2006, conductor Osmo Vänskä lead the Minnesota Orchestra in the world premiere of "Solace".  In 2008, renowned French Cellist Xavier Phillips premiered "La Chapelle d'Aiguilhe: Concerto for Cello & Orchestra" with the Orchestre National des Pays de la Loire under conductor Sascha Goetzel.

Byrnes has taught composition at Illinois Wesleyan University as adjunct assistant professor of composition, at Indiana University as associate instructor of composition, and at Ball State University as assistant professor of composition and theory.  He  has studied composition with Sven-David Sandström, Chen Yi, Don Freund, David Dzubay, and Larry Bell.  In addition to awards from the American Music Center, National Association of Composers, ASCAP, USA International Harp Composition Competition, California State University, Northridge, Indiana University, Boston Conservatory and others, Byrnes has received fellowships from the artist retreat organizations Yaddo and the Virginia Center for the Creative Arts.

Byrnes' harp works have been recorded on the Channel Classics and Kalan Müzik recording labels. His viola works have been recorded on the Arabesque Records label.

Major works 
Capriccio Improvviso (15', 2013)
Viola & Piano

Commissioned by and dedicated to Maggie Snyder through the generosity of the University of Georgia's Willson Center Grant for the Humanities
Leeds Devil Nocturne (12', 2012)
Flute (optional piccolo) & Piano

Commissioned by the Cleveland Chamber Collective and written for Mary Kay Fink and Nicholas Underhill

Valley of Butterflies (15', 2011)
Harp solo, 5 movements
Capriccio Tempestoso (10', 2010)
Orchestra: 2-1-2-1; 2-2-2-1; timp, perc (1); solo harp; strings
Devil in Moscow (15', 2009)
A Fantastical Character Suite for Viola & Harpsichord

Commissioned by Maggie Snyder and Alexandra Snyder Dunbar through the generosity of the West Virginia University Foundation

La Chapelle d'Aiguilhe: Concerto for Cello & Orchestra (18', 2008)
Orchestra: 2-2-2-2; 2-2-0-0; timp.; solo cello; strings

Commissioned for Xavier Phillips and the Orchestre National des Pays de la Loire

Mosaics (for wind quintet, 8', 2008)
Commissioned by the Alpha Lambda chapter of Phi Mu Alpha Sinfonia fraternity of Illinois Wesleyan University

Villanelle (for violin and harp, 15', 2006)
Commissioned for Lavinia Meijer and Tjeerd Top.

Solace (17’, 2005)
Orchestra: 3-3-3-3; 4-3-3-1; timp., 3 perc., pno./cel., harp, strings

Concerto for Piano & Chamber Orchestra (15’, 2003)
Piano Solo & Chamber Orchestra: 1111; 1111; 2 perc, hp, 2111
Commissioned by the Indiana University New Music Ensemble

Persist (13’, 2003)
For eight cellos
Commissioned by Florent Renard-Payen and the Tarab Cello Ensemble

Triptyclysm (16’, 2002)
For percussion trio
Commissioned by Tonus Percussion Group

Songs of the Sea (15’, 2001)
Tenor & Piano, 5 movements

Visions in Twilight (8’, 2000)
Harp solo
Written for Fatma Ceren Necipoğlu
Available from Lyon & Healy West

The Flames of Imbolc (12', 1999)
Orchestra: 3-3-3-3; 4-3-3-1; timp., 3 perc.; strings

External links 
 GarrettByrnes.com, Byrnes' home site, with list of works and other pertinent information.

1971 births
Living people
20th-century classical composers
21st-century classical composers
American male classical composers
American classical composers
Boston Conservatory at Berklee alumni
Peabody Institute alumni
Jacobs School of Music alumni
Illinois Wesleyan University faculty
Indiana University faculty
Ball State University faculty
21st-century American composers
20th-century American composers
20th-century American male musicians
21st-century American male musicians